Claudia Hürtgen (born 10 September 1971 in Aachen) is a German race driver. Along with Ellen Lohr and Sabine Schmitz, she is one of Germany's best known female racers.

Hürtgen started her career in karting and moved to German Formula Three. In 1993, during the F3 invitational race of the Monaco Grand Prix weekend, she suffered hand injuries in a roll-over crash, which ended her single-seater career.

She began racing again with touring cars in 1995, winning the Austrian championship, followed with sports car racing, in which she scored class wins, in an LMP-675 class car or a Porsche, in the American Le Mans Series as well as in the 24 Hours of Daytona and the 24 Hours of Le Mans.

In 2000, she returned to the site of her crash, to win the Monaco Historic Grand Prix in a Maserati.

Between 2003 and 2004, she was champion in Germany's Deutsche Tourenwagen Challenge (DTC), which was renamed DMSB-Produktionswagen-Meisterschaft (DPM).

In 2005, Team Schubert and Hürtgen moved on the VLN endurance racing series on the Nürburgring Nordschleife. Hürtgen won the VLN championship in 2005, making her the first female champion since Sabine Schmitz in 1998.

At the 2006 24 Hours Nürburgring, Hürtgen drove two cars for a total of 11 hours, scoring 5th place among 220 cars with a 245 bhp 120d.

2011 saw Hürtgen compete with Team Schubert (as Team Need for Speed) in the FIA GT3 European Championship and in various endurance races. She won the Dubai 24 Hour and finished 2nd overall at the Spa 24 Hours having started from 49th on the grid, in addition to her three podiums in the FIA GT3 season.

In 2021, Hürtgen was set to compete in Extreme E with ABT CUPRA XE alongside Mattias Ekström.

Racing record

24 Hours of Le Mans results

Complete Extreme E results
(key)

References

External links

1971 births
Living people
Sportspeople from Aachen
Racing drivers from North Rhine-Westphalia
German female racing drivers
German racing drivers
German Formula Three Championship drivers
24 Hours of Le Mans drivers
American Le Mans Series drivers
Blancpain Endurance Series drivers
ADAC GT Masters drivers
European Touring Car Championship drivers
European Touring Car Cup drivers
24 Hours of Spa drivers
24 Hours of Daytona drivers
Extreme E drivers
Nürburgring 24 Hours drivers
Abt Sportsline drivers

RSM Marko drivers
Cupra Racing drivers
24H Series drivers